Charlene Thompson (born 26 July 1967) is a former Bermudian woman cricketer. She has played for Bermuda at the 2008 Women's Cricket World Cup Qualifier.

References

External links 

1967 births
Living people
Bermudian women cricketers